The 2004 Critérium du Dauphiné Libéré was the 56th edition of the cycle race and was held from 6 June to 13 June 2004. The race started in Megève and finished in Grenoble. The race was won by Iban Mayo of the  team.

Teams
Twelve teams, containing a total of 95 riders, participated in the race:

Route

General classification

Notes

References

Further reading

External links

2004
2004 in French sport
Critérium du Dauphiné Libéré